The Rodina class is a class of Russian river passenger ships. "Rodina" means "motherland" in Russian.

They were three-deck cargo-passenger ships manufactured in Germany from 1954–1961.

River passenger ships of the project 588

Overview

RRR — Russian River Register

YRSCO – Yenisseiskoye Rechnoye Parokhodstvo; VURSCO – Volzhskoye Obyedinyonnoye Rechnoye Parokhodstvo (today – Volzhskoye Parokhodstvo, VSCO); MRSCO – Moskovskoye Rechnoye Parokhodstvo; KRSCO – Kamskoye Rechnoye Parokhodstvo; BORSCO – Belomoro-Onezhskoye Rechnoye Parokhodstvo; NWRSCO – Severo-Zapadnoye Rechnoye Parokhodstvo

See also
 List of river cruise ships
 Rossiya-class motorship (1952)
 Rossiya-class motorship (1973)
 Dmitriy Furmanov-class motorship
 Valerian Kuybyshev-class motorship
 Baykal-class motorship
 Anton Chekhov-class motorship
 Sergey Yesenin-class motorship
 Oktyabrskaya Revolyutsiya-class motorship
 Yerofey Khabarov-class motorship

References

External links

River cruise ships
Ships of Russia
Ships of the Soviet Union
East Germany–Soviet Union relations
Ships built in East Germany